Jordan Efa Okwudili Emaviwe (born 9 April 2001) is a Singaporean professional footballer who plays as a forward for Singapore Premier League club Young Lions and the Singapore under-23 team. He is also capable of playing as a centre-back or central-midfielder when needed.

He had spent three years at Swiss second-tier side Chiasso from 2017–2020.   He is the 2nd Singaporean to follow the footsteps of V. Sundram Moorthy in signing a first-team professional contract with a Swiss club.    He caught the eyes of the Swiss club after playing for Serie D club ADSP Ciliverghe di Mazzano against Chiasso.

Club career

Balestier Khalsa
Jordan signed with Singapore Premier League club Balestier Khalsa in 2020. He made a total of 6 appearances for the club.

Young Lions
Jordan then signed with the Young Lions in 2021.

International career
Emaviwe was born in Singapore to a Nigerian father and a Singaporean Chinese mother. He represents Singapore at international level and played at the 2021 Southeast Asian Games.

He helped the U23 team snatched a draw from the jaws of damaging defeat in their opening match at the Hanoi SEA Games against Laos with a 96min goal.  

However, he was not included in the squad for the 2022 AFF Mitsubishi Electric Cup squad by Takayagi Nishigaya.

Career statistics

Club

International

Caps
U-23

Goals
U-23

References

2001 births
Living people
Singaporean footballers
Singapore youth international footballers
Singaporean people of Nigerian descent
Singaporean people of Chinese descent
Association football defenders
Singapore Premier League players
Balestier Khalsa FC players
FC Chiasso players
Singaporean expatriate footballers
Expatriate footballers in Switzerland
Expatriate footballers in Italy
Competitors at the 2021 Southeast Asian Games
Southeast Asian Games competitors for Singapore